Jessica Kennedy may refer to:

Jessica Parker Kennedy, actress
Jessica Kennedy, character in Bad Behaviour
Jessica L Kennedy, American artist
Jess Kennedy, Australian rules footballer